The whiskered flowerpecker (Dicaeum proprium) is a species of bird in the family Dicaeidae. It is endemic to the island of Mindanao in the Philippines.

Its natural habitat is subtropical or tropical moist montane forest. It is becoming rare due to habitat loss.

Description and Taxonomy 

EBird describes the bird as "A tiny bird of lower montane forest and edge on Mindanao, where it feeds on mistletoe. Glossy black above and brown below, with a whitish moustache stripe bordered below by a thin black line, a thin white throat patch, and a white line on the sides. Female has a blackish-brown crown and upperparts. Distinguished from all other flowerpeckers by its brown underparts. Voice is a soft “chup” or harsh “juk!”"  Often seen feeding on fruiting and flowering trees where it feeds on fruit, nectar, and pollen. They are apparently dependent on mistletoe flowers.

Subspecies 
Two subspecies are recognized

 Dicaeum nigrilore nigrilore: : Found in West, Central and Southern Mindanao ; more visible yellow rump
 Dicaeum nigrilore diuatae: Found in Northeast Mindanao; overall darker green and drabber in overall color and greenish yellow rump

and a possible third subspecies found in Southeast Mindanao which has a yellowish-green head. Further study needed on this potential subspecies.

Habitat and Conservation Status 
It inhabits tropical moist primary and secondary sub-montane and montane forest and forest edge  1,000 masl where they are dependent on mistletoe flowers.  

IUCN has assessed this bird as a least-concern species. Despite a limited range, it is said to be locally common in its range. As it occurs in rugged and inaccessible mountains, this has allowed a large portion of its habitat to remain intact. It is also able to tolerate degraded forest. However, the population is still said to be declining, it is still affected by habitat loss through deforestation, mining, land conversion and slash-and-burn - just not to the same extent as lowland forest.

References

whiskered flowerpecker
Birds of Mindanao
whiskered flowerpecker
Taxonomy articles created by Polbot